David Maturen (born February 8, 1948) is an American politician who represented the 63rd District in the Michigan House of Representatives. He was elected in November 2014 and serves as vice chair of the House Tax Policy Committee and was a member of the Energy Policy, Local Government, and Transportation and Infrastructure committees. The 63rd District encompasses parts of Calhoun and Kalamazoo counties.

Prior to being elected to the Michigan House of Representatives, Maturen served on the Kalamazoo County Board of Commissioners for 12 years.

Education 
Maturen holds a bachelor's degree in Business Administration and a Master of Public Administration degree from Western Michigan University.

Personal life and professional career 
Maturen grew up in Essexville, Michigan. He has been married to his wife, Nancy, for 45 years, and they have three daughters and two granddaughters.

Maturen is a licensed real estate appraiser and real estate broker. Maturen is the owner of the Portage-based real estate appraisal firm Maturen & Associates, Inc. and previously served as the chair of the State Board of Real Estate Appraisers and as secretary to the board of trustees of the Appraisal Foundation.

References

Maturen State House Bio

1948 births
Living people
Republican Party members of the Michigan House of Representatives
Western Michigan University alumni
21st-century American politicians